Veda bread is a brand of malt loaf sold in Ireland. It is a small, caramel-colored malted bread with a soft consistency when fresh, and is manufactured by Allied Bakeries Ireland (ABI).

In Northern England, Veda bread is a sweet, sticky loaf made with black treacle. It is usually eaten sliced or dry, with butter or margarine. The molasses in the treacle help to preserve the mixture, and Veda-bread connoisseurs will leave a freshly baked loaf for several weeks in a closed cake tin to allow the flavors to mature before they eat it.

Although a sweet bread, Veda is often toasted with butter and cheese, although many prefer to add jam or marmalade. It is usually eaten as a snack.

The formula for Veda was allegedly stumbled upon by luck when a Dundee farmer's house-keeper accidentally used damp wheat which had sprouted to produce malted wheat (which is just one of many ways bread using wheat flour can be made, and a common way wheat could be used, just not commonly for bread). This produced a sweet-malted flavored bread.

Veda Bakeries holds the original recipe for Veda bread, and they have not published it publicly. Veda Bakeries is a company registered by law. The company is based in East Lothian in Haddington, and is owned by Jim Kerr of Forthestuary Cereals.

See also
 List of breads

References

External links 
 Records of Gleneagles Maltings Ltd

Irish breads
Cuisine of Northern Ireland